Roy Emilio Alvarez (born June 8, 1991) is an American professional baseball pitcher who is a free agent. He has previously played in Major League Baseball (MLB) for the San Diego Padres, Oakland Athletics and New York Mets.

Career
Alvarez attended Cardinal Newman High School in West Palm Beach, Florida, and Florida Atlantic University, where he played college baseball for the Florida Atlantic Owls. In 2010, he played collegiate summer baseball for the Bourne Braves of the Cape Cod Baseball League, and was named an All-Star. After spending his freshman and sophomore season as a starting pitcher, he was moved to the bullpen before his junior season.

Alvarez was drafted by the Los Angeles Angels of Anaheim in the third round of the 2012 Major League Baseball Draft. In 2013, he had a 2.96 earned run average with 79 strikeouts over  innings pitched. Prior to the 2014 season, Alvarez was ranked by Baseball America as the Angels fourth best prospect. He started the season with the Arkansas Travelers.

San Diego Padres
On July 19, 2014, Alvarez was traded to the San Diego Padres with José Rondón, Taylor Lindsey, and Elliot Morris in exchange for Huston Street and Trevor Gott. He was called up to the majors for the first time on September 2, 2014. He made his major league debut on September 3.

Oakland Athletics

On December 18, 2014, the Padres traded Alvarez and Jesse Hahn to the Oakland Athletics for Derek Norris, Seth Streich, and international bonus slot 117. In 21 appearances in 2015, he posted a 9.90 ERA.

Chicago Cubs
Alvarez was claimed off waivers by Chicago Cubs on June 11, 2016, and was assigned to their AAA affiliate, the Iowa Cubs.

Texas Rangers
Alvarez was claimed off waivers by the Texas Rangers on September 10, 2016. He elected free agency on November 2, 2018.

Miami Marlins
On November 26, 2018, Alvarez signed a minor league contract with the Miami Marlins with an invitation to spring training. He opened the 2019 season with the New Orleans Baby Cakes. He became a free agent following the 2019 season.

Boston Red Sox
On December 20, 2019, the Boston Red Sox signed Alvarez to a minor league deal and invited him to spring training. He was released by Boston on August 26, 2020, without having made an appearance with the team.

Milwaukee Brewers
On April 4, 2021, Alvarez signed a minor league contract with the Milwaukee Brewers organization.

New York Mets
On March 1, 2022, Alvarez signed a minor league deal with the New York Mets. He was designated for assignment on July 28, 2022, and was sent outright to Triple-A. On August 16, 2022, Alvarez's contract was selected by the Mets and promoted to the major league roster. After pitching  innings and giving up 3 earned runs, he was designated for assignment the next day. He elected free agency on November 10, 2022.

References

External links

Florida Atlantic Owls bio

1991 births
Living people
Sportspeople from West Palm Beach, Florida
Baseball players from Florida
Major League Baseball pitchers
San Diego Padres players
Oakland Athletics players
New York Mets players
Florida Atlantic Owls baseball players
Bourne Braves players
Cedar Rapids Kernels players
Inland Empire 66ers of San Bernardino players
Arkansas Travelers players
San Antonio Missions players
Mesa Solar Sox players
Nashville Sounds players
New Orleans Baby Cakes players
Round Rock Express players